Vanee Foods Company, Inc., is a manufacturer of a variety of food products, from canned entrees and gravies to dry mixes and soup bases.The company's products are marketed primarily through the foodservice and club store channels. Vanee Foods also manufactures custom formulations for national and regional chain restaurants, and is a co-packer for several major food companies. Founded by Joseph and Adriana VanEekeren in 1950 in downtown Chicago, Vanee Foods is still family owned and operated. Today, there are ten family members involved in the day-to-day management of the company.

Vanee Foods was involved in a minor recall in 2014 after 3,156 pounds of turkey base was mislabeled omitting contents which included milk, a known allergen. During the 1980’s and 1990’s Vanee Foods supplied T-Rations to the United States Army during Operation Desert Shield and Operation Desert Storm

See also 
 List of food companies

References

External links

Canned food
Food manufacturers of the United States
Food and drink companies established in 1950
Companies based in Cook County, Illinois
1950 establishments in Illinois

Food and drink companies based in Illinois